Rapti Highway is a highway in central Nepal that crosses the districts of Dang, Salyan and West Rukum in a south to north direction.
The 176 km highway branches off Mahendra Highway in Satbariya towards Tulsipur in the North, where it intersects with Feeder Road 15 just north of Dang Airport, a road that connects the highway to the district headquarter of Dang, Ghorahi. Rapti Highway then follows Sharada River and passes the municipalities Sharada and Bagchaur. From there, the highway runs towards Musikot Khalanga, the district headquarter of West Rukum District, where it terminates.

References

Highways in Nepal